The 1923 Toronto Argonauts season was the 37th season for the team since the franchise's inception in 1873. The team finished in second place in the Interprovincial Rugby Football Union with a 3–1–2 record and failed to qualify for the playoffs.

Regular season

Standings

Schedule

References

Toronto Argonauts seasons